This is a list of golf awards.

PGA Tour

PGA Tour Champions

European Tour

United States Golf Association
Bob Jones Award
Joe Dey Award
Herbert Warren Wind Book Award
Green Section Award

LPGA Tour
See: LPGA#LPGA Tour awards

Intercollegiate golf
Haskins Award
Ben Hogan Award
Edith Cummings Munson Golf Award
Dinah Shore Trophy Award
Jack Nicklaus Award - given to the best NCAA Division I golf player

See also
Claret Jug
Wanamaker Trophy

 
golf